The 2012 AIHL season is the 13th season of the Australian Ice Hockey League (AIHL). It ran from 28 April 2012 until 26 August 2012, with the Goodall Cup finals following on the 1 and 2 September. The Newcastle North Stars won the H Newman Ried Trophy after finishing the regular season with the most points. The Melbourne Ice won the Goodall Cup for the third year in a row after defeating the North Stars in the final.

Teams
In 2012 the AIHL had 9 teams competing in the league.

League business
During the off-season the Australian Ice Hockey League announced that Perth Thunder had been accepted as a full member of the league expanding the competition to nine teams. The Mustangs IHC changed their name to the Melbourne Mustangs after the AIHL lifted a condition that prohibited the use of "Melbourne" in their team name. The restriction was originally put in place to protect the brand of the Melbourne Ice. It was also announced that from 2012 the league would be split into two conferences in order to manage costs and length of the season. The two conferences where named the Bauer Conference and Easton Conference after the AIHL signed a three-year deal with the Skaters Network who is the distributor of the ice hockey brands Bauer Hockey and Easton Hockey. The Bauer Conference will consist of the Canberra Knights, Newcastle North Stars, Sydney Bears, and the Sydney Ice Dogs, while the Easton Conference includes the Adelaide Adrenaline, Gold Coast Blue Tongues, Melbourne Ice, Melbourne Mustangs and the Perth Thunder. Following the announcement of the conference system a change in the finals playoff structure was also announced. The winners of each conference at the end of the regular season would play in a semi-final against the runner-up of the opposing conference with the winners of the semi-finals progressing to the Goodall Cup final. It was also announced a one-year partnership with Virgin Australia in which the airline would become the leagues preferred supplier for the 2012 season. In February 2012 the Sydney Bears announced that they were leaving the Penrith Ice Palace as their home arena and were returning to play their games at the Sydney Ice Arena in Baulkham Hills where they had previously played from 2003 to 2006. In April 2012 the AIHL announced that the Sydney Ice Dogs would be restricted to the dress of only three import players per game, as opposed to the normal four. The restriction is part of the penalties imposed on the club after it breached the AIHL code of conduct during the 2011 Goodall Cup final series in which a player and two team officials were involved in an assault of a Medibank Icehouse security guard.

Prior to the start of the regular season, three exhibition games were held. The first game was held between the Mustangs and the Melbourne Ice at the Medibank Icehouse with the Mustangs winning the game 5–2. The second and third games were played between the Sydney Bears and the Sydney Ice Dogs, with the Sydney Bears winning the first game 5–2 and the Sydney Ice Dogs winning the second game 5–4 in a shootout.

On 3 June, Gold Coast Blue Tongues' home game against the Melbourne Ice at Bundall Iceland was called off after a shortened first period due to an unplayable surface; it was the second such cancellation in less than a year at Bundall Iceland, with 10 July 2011 match between the Blue Tongues and Sydney Ice Dogs cancelled without play for the same reason. After the cancelled game, Gold Coast was evicted from the rink by its owners, and on 8 June, it was announced that its remaining seven home games for the season would be played at Iceworld in Acacia Ridge, Brisbane; the matches will begin at 10:30pm, with a better time unable to be negotiated with the rink due to the short notice of the relocation. Although Melbourne was offered a win by forfeit for the cancelled match, the club agreed instead to reschedule the match to Thursday 23 August, to be played in Melbourne (although technically a Gold Coast home game).

During July there will be a weeks break for the first Trans-Tasman Champions League. The formation of the Trans-Tasman Champions League was announced back in August 2011 between the AIHL and the New Zealand Ice Hockey League (NZIHL). The series will feature two teams from each the AIHL and the NZIHL each playing the others once with the winner being the team who finishes first in the round-robin standings. The two teams chosen from each league will be the 2011 regular season champions and the winner of the 2011 playoffs. In a situation where the winning of both events is the same the runner up of the playoff final will be selected to represent their respective league.

Player transfers

Regular season
The regular season will start on 28 April 2012 and will run through to 26 August 2012 before the teams compete in the playoff series. The Gold Coast Blue Tongues' final seven home games were relocated from Bundall, Gold Coast to Acacia Ridge, Brisbane after the cancelled match on 3 June. All relocated matches were scheduled to commence at 10:30pm, and the dates of some of the matches were adjusted to accommodate the away teams' travel plans.

The Newcastle North Stars won the H Newman Reid Trophy after finishing the regular season with the most points, 52. On 29 August the AIHL released the list of finalists for the 2012 awards. Matt Armstrong of the Melbourne Ice, Jeremy Boyer of the Newcastle North Stars, Perth Thunder's Kenny Rolph and Sydney Bears' Tomas Landa were nominated for the Most Valuable Player award, with Boyer and Landa both winning the award. Aaron Barton of Adelaide Adrenaline, Anthony Kimlin of the Gold Coast Blue Tongues and Perth Thunder's Kiefer Smiley were nominated for the Top Goaltender award with Anthony Kimlin being named the winner. Adam Blanchette of the Blue Tongues, Scott Levitt of the Melbourne Mustangs and Newcastle's Rob Lawrance were nominated for the Top Defenceman award with Rob Lawrance being announced as the winner. George Huber of the Adrenaline, Greg Bay of the Blue Tongues, the Mustangs' Brendan McDowell and Perth's David Kudla were all nominated for the Rookie of the Year award with George Huber and Greg Bay tying for the win.

April

May

June

July

August

Standings

Bauer Conference

Easton Conference

Source

Statistics

Scoring leaders
List shows the ten top skaters sorted by points, then goals.

Leading goaltenders
Only the top five goaltenders, based on save percentage with a minimum of ten games played.

Season awards

Below lists the 2012 AIHL regular season award winners.

Source

Goodall Cup playoffs
The 2012 playoffs started on 1 September 2012, with the Goodall Cup final being held on 2 September. Following the end of the regular season the top two teams from each conference advanced to the playoff series with the winner of each conference playing in the semi-final round against the runner-up of the other conference. All three games were held at the Hunter Ice Skating Stadium in Warners Bay, New South Wales, the home of the Newcastle North Stars. The series was a single game elimination with the two winning semi-finalists advancing to the Goodall Cup final. The Melbourne Ice completed the three-peat and won the Goodall Cup for the third year in a row after defeating the Newcastle North Stars in the final. Todd Graham of the Melbourne Ice was named the finals MVP.

All times are UTC+10:00

Semi-finals

Final

References

External links
The Australian Ice Hockey League

2012 in ice hockey
2012 in Australian sport
2012